In 2010 there was no obvious, primary athletics championship, as neither the Summer Olympics nor the World Championships in Athletics occurred in the year. The foremost championships to be held in 2010 included: the 2010 IAAF World Indoor Championships, 2010 European Athletics Championships, 2010 African Championships in Athletics, and Athletics at the 2010 Commonwealth Games.

Two major competitions debuted in new formats. The IAAF Diamond League – a worldwide expansion on the European-centred IAAF Golden League concept – saw a schedule of fourteen one-day meetings with some of the sport's most prominent athletes centrally contracted to a track and field series for the first time. The second competition was the renamed IAAF Continental Cup (formerly World Cup) which had its format simplified: previously a contest between several countries and continents, it comprised only four teams (Africa, the Americas, Europe and Asia/Oceania).

Major events

World

World Indoor Championships in Athletics
World Junior Championships in Athletics
Continental Cup
Commonwealth Games
Summer Youth Olympics
IAAF Diamond League
World Marathon Majors
World Cross Country Championships
World Half Marathon Championships
IAAF World Race Walking Cup
WMRA World Mountain Running Championships

Regional

African Championships
Asian Indoor Championships
Asian Junior Championships
Asian Games
Central American and Caribbean Games
Central American Games
European Athletics Championships
European Cross Country Championships
European Cup Winter Throwing
European Mountain Running Championships
European Team Championships
Ibero-American Championships
Micronesian Games
NACAC Cross Country Championships
South American Games
South American U23 Championships
South American Cross Country Championships
South Asian Games
South Asian Junior Championships
Oceania Athletics Championships
Oceania Cross Country Championships

National 

 2010 American Samoa Athletics Championships
 2010 German Athletics Championships
 2010 Guam Athletics Championships
 2010 Kiribati Athletics Championships
 2010 Latvian Athletics Championships
 2010 Lithuanian Athletics Championships
 2010 USA Outdoor Track and Field Championships

Local 
 2010 Vilnius Athletics Championships

World records

Men

Women

Season's bests

Awards

Men

Women

Doping

The highest profile doping case in 2010 was that of 400 m Olympic and World Champion LaShawn Merritt. He failed three out-of-competition tests in October and December 2009, and January 2010, testing positive for Dehydroepiandrosterone (DHEA) on each occasion. He claimed that he had inadvertently ingested the substance via an over the counter sex enhancement drug he was using at the time (ExtenZe). Initially set for a two-year ban, he received a reduced 21-month suspension from October 2010 to July 2012 as a result of his co-operation with anti-doping authorities. However, the seriousness of the doping substance meant he was automatically banned from defending his title at the 2012 London Olympics.

A major investigation by the Guardia Civil into doping in Spain, known as Operación Galgo, began in April 2010 and made headline news in December following a number of arrests. Marta Domínguez, world steeplechase champion and vice president of the Spanish Athletics Federation, was implicated in the blood doping ring. Manuel Pascua Piqueras, coach to a number of prominent runners, admitted to doping his athletes, while Alemayehu Bezabeh (the 2009 European Cross Country Champion) admitted to using banned substances.

Olympic champion Shelly-Ann Fraser received a six-month ban after a positive test for pain relief narcotic oxycodone at the Shanghai Diamond League meeting. Her coach Stephen Francis, who had the painkiller on prescription for his kidney stones, gave the banned substance to his athlete to relieve her toothache.

Another sprinter Laverne Jones-Ferrette ran the fastest 60 metres in a decade in February, but was absent from outdoor competition in 2010. This was later explained by the revelation that she had failed a drug test for clomiphene on February 16. The substance can be used as a complement to steroid cycles, but can also act as a fertility drug and Jones-Ferrette (who announced her pregnancy in November) claimed this was the intended usage. She was banned from competition for six months, lasting from April to September, and lost her silver medal from the World Indoor Championships. Bobby-Gaye Wilkins won a relay medal for Jamaica at the same championships, but she was also stripped of her medal after testing positive for andarine – a selective androgen receptor modulator (SARM).

A series of athletes were disqualified from the 2010 Commonwealth Games in New Delhi as a result of in-competition testing. Nigerians Samuel Okon and Oludamola Osayomi (the 100 m gold medallist) were banned for using the stimulant methylhexanamine. A third Nigerian, Folashade Abugan who won silver medals in the 400 m individual and relay races, failed a drug test for traces of testosterone prohormone and was stripped of her honours Indian racewalker Rani Yadav was also banned after testing positive for 19-Norandrosterone.

Retired American sprinters Ramon Clay and Crystal Cox received retrospective bans from the United States Anti-Doping Agency due to their steroid usage relating to the BALCO scandal period from 2001 to 2004. Cox was stripped of her Olympic relay gold medal as a result. Former Jamaican runner Raymond Stewart was given a life ban from coaching for trafficking and administering banned substances as part of an ongoing investigation. Olympic Bahraini sprinter Roqaya Al-Gassra was banned for two years. Other prominent athletes to receive suspensions included South American triple jump champion Johana Triviño (two years for stanozolol), Asian indoor champion Munira Saleh (life ban for second violation with stanozolol), and 2010 CAC Games medallist Zudikey Rodríguez (methylhexanamine).

Deaths
February 6 — Kipkemboi Kimeli (43), Kenyan long-distance runner
February 17 — Luigi Ulivelli (74), Italian long jumper and Mediterranean champion
February 17 — David Lelei (38), Kenyan middle-distance runner and Africa Games medallist
March 2 — Paul Drayton (70), American sprinter and 1960 Olympic medallist
March 17 — Wayne Collett (60), American sprinter and 1972 Olympic medallist
August 10 — Antonio Pettigrew (42), American 400 m runner and 1991 World Champion
August 18 — Hal Connolly (79), American hammer thrower and 1956 Olympic champion
August 26 — Frank Baumgartl (55), East German Olympic steeplechase medallist
August 29 — Dejene Berhanu (29), Ethiopian marathon runner
October 8 — Jim Fuchs (82), American world record holder in the shot put
November 14 — Wes Santee (78), American middle-distance runner and former world record holder

See also
 Eufemiano Fuentes

References

Further reading
Annual season reviews from IAAF by A. Lennart Julin and Mirko Jalava:

Sprints
Middle-distances
Long-distance (track)

Road running and race walking
Hurdles

Jumps
Throws
Combined events

Athletics (track and field) by year